Frédéric Plesius (born February 10, 1988) is a professional Canadian football linebacker who is currently a free agent. He most recently played for the Montreal Alouettes of the Canadian Football League (CFL). Plesius made his professional debut for the Hamilton Tiger-Cats in 2013. He has also been a member of the Philadelphia Eagles and Winnipeg Blue Bombers.

College career
Plesius first played for the Baylor University Bears, where he was a redshirt in 2008. He then played CIS football with the Laval Rouge et Or where he was a two-time Vanier Cup champion in 2010 and 2012.

Professional career

Philadelphia Eagles
Plesius attended a rookie training camp held by the Philadelphia Eagles of the National Football League.

Hamilton Tiger-Cats
After the 2011 CIS season, he was ranked as the fifth best player in the Canadian Football League’s Amateur Scouting Bureau final rankings for players eligible in the 2012 CFL Draft, and third by players in Canadian Interuniversity Sport. Plesius was drafted in the second round (tenth overall) by the Hamilton Tiger-Cats of the Canadian Football League in the 2012 CFL Draft. He spent the 2012 CFL season with the Laval Rouge et Or in the CIS. On June 24, 2013, following the CFL preseason games, he signed a 3-year contract with the Ti-cats. In his first season with the Tiger-Cats, Plesius was utilized primarily on special teams. In 2014, Plesius took on a larger role within the team defense as he accounted for 18 tackles, one interception and two fumble recoveries.

Montreal Alouettes
On February 12, 2017, Plesius was traded to the Montreal Alouettes for Nicholas Shortill. He played in seven games with the team in 2017 and recorded seven special teams tackles. Following the season, he was released by the Alouettes on January 31, 2018.

Winnipeg Blue Bombers
On July 24, 2018, Plesius signed with the Winnipeg Blue Bombers. He played in six regular season games, recording four defensive tackles and five special teams tackles. He became a free agent after the 2018 season.

Montreal Alouettes (II)
On August 6, 2019, Plesius was re-signed by the Montreal Alouettes. He played in six regular season games and the team's lone post-season game where he recorded a total of five special teams tackles. His contract expired on February 11, 2020, and he was not signed by any team during the cancelled 2020 CFL season. He was re-signed by the Alouettes on October 4, 2021. He played in five games and recorded three special teams tackles. He was released on May 6, 2022.

References

External links
Montreal Alouettes bio
Winnipeg Blue Bombers bio
Hamilton Tiger-Cats bio

1988 births
Living people
Players of Canadian football from Quebec
Canadian football linebackers
Hamilton Tiger-Cats players
Laval Rouge et Or football players
Montreal Alouettes players
Sportspeople from Laval, Quebec
Baylor Bears football players
Winnipeg Blue Bombers players